Skull Gang Entertainment is a hip-hop label formed by Skull Gang member Juelz Santana in 2008. With his usual crew on hold due to infighting and his solo career tied up in contract disputes,  Dipset member Juelz Santana formed his own group, Skull Gang, in 2008. Featuring Santana along with Richmond Rab, Starr, Unkasa, John Depp, Deniro, and Riq Rose, the crew first appeared on the mixtape Takeover: The New Movement to Move With released in 2008. A year later, many of the tracks ended up on the group's self-titled debut album released by the E-1 label. In 2011 Juelz Santana will release his second studio album in a joint venture 50/50 with Def Jam on June 15

Skull Gang 
In 2008 Juelz Santana created a group known as Skull Gang. The group consists of Richmond Rab, Starr, Unkasa, John Depp, Deniro, and Riq Rose. They released a solo album, also known as Skull Gang, which debuted at number 145 at US Billboard 200. Also they released a lot of mixtapes and have a collaboration album with Mike Epps and Jim Jones called Bad Santa.

Discography

Albums

Mixtapes

Solo albums

Juelz Santana

References

American record labels